Claude Gallimard (10 January 1914 – 29 April 1991) was a French publisher and business leader.

The son of Gaston Gallimard, he was, from 1976 to 1988, the head of the publishing house Gallimard, founded by his father in 1911.

Biography 
Claude Gallimard worked in the family business of which he would become the president at the death of his father on 15 January 1976.

Married to Simone Cornu, he had with her four children who all worked in the book trades: Françoise, Christian, Antoine, and Isabelle.

In 1988, ill, Claude Gallimard handed the management of the group to his son Antoine, after removing his eldest son, Christian.

External links 
 Chronologie: Claude Gallimard biographie
 Claude Gallimard à propos des manuscrits de Proust et Céline - (15 February 1970) 
 Claude Gallimard on INA.fr (19 November 1979)
 Claude Gallimard on Radio Télévision Suisse (12 December 1972)
 Obituary on the New York Times (2 May 1991)

French publishers (people)
French chief executives
1914 births
1991 deaths
Claude